Memorial Tower, or the Campanile as it is sometimes called, is a 175-foot clock tower in the center of Louisiana State University's campus in Baton Rouge, Louisiana, United States. Erected in 1923 and officially dedicated in 1926, it stands as a memorial to Louisianans who died in World War I.

The Plaza 

The plaza area in front of Memorial Tower has served as a place of both ceremony and celebration. The University's annual Christmas Tree Lighting Ceremony takes place on the plaza and attracts many visitors to the area. In addition, Student Government holds the formal installation for its new President and Vice President each spring. Valentine's Day is especially important for the plaza, as superstition turned tradition says to become an official "LSU student," one must be kissed under the Memorial Tower when the chimes ring at midnight. Those wishing to carry out the tradition today find that the chimes no longer ring after 10 p.m. except for the evening of Valentine's Day.

Upon entering the tower, visitors find the rotunda of bronze plaques bearing the names of 1,447 fallen Louisiana World War I soldiers, to whom the tower is dedicated. The inside of the tower is also home to a military museum.

The Chimes 

Each quarter-hour, the LSU community can hear the sound of chimes coming from the bells of the clock tower. The Westminster Chimes are used each day until 10p.m. At noon, the University's alma mater is played.

See also
List of tallest buildings in Baton Rouge

References

External links

Memorial Tower-Campus Map
Memorial Tower

Towers completed in 1926
Louisiana State University buildings and structures
Clock towers in Louisiana
Bell towers in the United States
Monuments and memorials in Louisiana
1926 establishments in Louisiana